Guidobaldo (Guido Ubaldo) da Montefeltro (25 January 1472 – 10 April 1508), also known as Guidobaldo I, was an Italian condottiero and the Duke of Urbino from 1482 to 1508.

Biography

Born in Gubbio, he succeeded his father Federico da Montefeltro as Duke of Urbino in 1482.

Guidobaldo married Elisabetta Gonzaga, the sister of Francesco II Gonzaga, Marquis of Mantua. Guidobaldo was impotent, and they had no children, but Elisabetta refused to divorce him.

He fought as one of Pope Alexander VI's captains alongside the French troops of King Charles VIII of France during the latter's invasion of southern Italy; later, he was hired by the Republic of Venice against Charles. In 1496, while fighting for the pope near Bracciano, Guidobaldo was taken prisoner by the Orsini and the Vitelli, being freed the following year.

Guidobaldo was forced to flee Urbino in 1502 to escape the armies of Cesare Borgia, but returned after the death of Cesare Borgia's father, Pope Alexander VI, in 1503. He adopted as his heir Francesco Maria della Rovere, his sister's child and nephew of Pope Julius II, thus uniting the seigniory of Senigallia with Urbino. He aided Pope Julius II in reconquering the Romagna.

The court of Urbino was at that time one of the most refined and elegant in Italy.  Many men of letters met there. The Italo-English historian Polydore Vergil may have worked in the service of Guidobaldo and Elisabetta as well as Baldassare Castiglione, the author of the book The Book of the Courtier, which describes the court of Urbino.

Suffering from gout, Guidobaldo died in Fossombrone at the age of 36, and was succeeded by his nephew.

See also
Holy Conversation (Piero della Francesca)
Portrait of Luca Pacioli
Saint George and the Dragon (Raphael)

Notes and references

Sources

Pietro Bembo, Vita dello illustrissimo s. Guidobaldo duca d'Vrbino. E della illustriss. sig. Helisabetta Gonzaga sua consorte, Firenze, Lorenzo Torrentino 1555
P. Giovio. Istorie dei suoi tempi, Venezia 1570
F. Ugolini. Guidobaldo da Montefeltro in «Imparziale fiorentino», 1857
Bernardino Baldi, Della vita e de' fatti di Guidobaldo I da Montefeltro, Duca d'Urbino libri dodici, Milano, Silvestri 1821
G. Franceschini. I Montefeltro, Milano 1970
C. H. Clough, A. Conti, Guidobaldo da Montefeltro, duca di Urbino: fu mai gonfaloniere di Sancta Romana Ecclesia? in «Studi Montefeltrani», n. 27, San Leo 2006

External links 
The Gubbio Studiolo and its conservation, volumes 1 & 2, from The Metropolitan Museum of Art Libraries (fully available online as PDF), which contains material on Guidobaldo da Montefeltro (see index)

1472 births
1508 deaths
People from Gubbio
Guidobaldo
15th-century condottieri
Knights of the Garter
Dukes of Urbino